Eldar Yuryevich Getokov (born 4 March 1986) is a former Russian professional football player.

Club career
He made his debut for the senior squad of PFC Spartak Nalchik in the Russian Cup on 13 July 2005 in a game against FC Terek Grozny.

See also
Football in Russia

References

External links
 

1986 births
Living people
Russian footballers
Association football midfielders
PFC Spartak Nalchik players